Loushanguan Road is a station on Shanghai Metro Line 2 and Line 15. It became an interchange station with the opening of line 15 on 23 January 2021.

Currently, passengers interchanging between lines 15 and 2 at Loushanguan Road Station must walk from station to station, because work on the underground passage hasn’t been completed. Those who pay with public transportation cards or through the official Metro app avoid additional fees when transferring.

Location 
The station is located between the Weining Road station and the Zhongshan Park station on Shanghai Metro Line 2. The station is located beneath the intersection of Loushanguan Road and Tianshan Road, along which the line runs. The station is located roughly between the Shanghai Hongqiao International Airport and the Huangpu River.

Station Layout

References 

Shanghai Metro stations in Changning District
Line 2, Shanghai Metro
Railway stations in China opened in 2006
Railway stations in Shanghai